Adventures in Babysitting is a 2016 American adventure comedy television film directed by John Schultz and starring Sabrina Carpenter and Sofia Carson. It is a remake of the 1987 film of the same name. The film premiered on Disney Channel in the United States and Canada on June 24, 2016, and is the 100th Disney Channel Original Movie.

Plot

Jenny Parker and Lola Perez are teenagers with opposite personalities but the same passion for photography. The two meet when they are finalists for a prestigious photography internship and accidentally switch phones at their interview. Helen Anderson calls Jenny's phone, begging for a last-minute babysitter because of a relative who couldn't make it. Lola is about to explain the mistake, but decides to take the job when she gets served with a parking ticket from Officer James. Jenny's crush Zac Chase calls to invite Jenny to a Psychic Rockets concert but Lola quickly and, coincidentally, dismisses him in order to flirt with Officer James. Zac mistakenly believes that Jenny is not interested in him so he decides to take another girl to the concert instead.

Jenny and Lola arrive at the Coopers' and the Andersons' for their respective babysitting jobs. Lola and Jenny realize they switched phones, and Jenny travels to Lola to switch back. By that time, Bobby has made a mess by cooking and Trey has snuck out to a Psychic Rockets concert despite being grounded.
Jenny, Lola, and the children journey in the Anderson's SUV to a sketchy pawn shop in the city in order to track Trey down. However, they find that he has already left with his friends. In the shop, Bobby accidentally lets loose a rare Sapphire Ferret and Lola takes a picture of the commotion for her photography resume. Since poaching and trafficking the animal is illegal, the pawn shop owners Tiny and Scalper chase the seven out of the store, trying to delete the photo from Lola's camera. The group makes it to the car only to find that it is being towed. The truck owner tells them that they need $100 to pay off the fine and have until midnight. The group is forced to take a bus to their next destination, Trey's favorite pizza parlor, Mario's. They find Trey and, now all together, try to figure out how to pay off the tow truck fees. Bobby spots Tiny and Scalper following them and a chase ensues into a clothing factory. The seven once again escape them and once they are safe, Lola suggests re-selling the ticket at the concert.

Tiny and Scalper track them down but hold off from revealing themselves when Lola gets arrested for illegally re-selling the ticket. As they wait at the police station, Jenny is horrified to see that Emily secretly dyed her hair green and got a tattoo in her arm and angrily reprimands her. Hurt, Emily calls and leaves a voicemail to her mom explaining the trouble they are in. In the interrogation room, Lola meets Officer James. He scolds her for trying to scalp the ticket, pointing out that she could have been hurt and is setting a bad example for her babysitting charges. Lola finally realizes her impulsiveness has consequences and begs to go free to make things right. Meanwhile, in the lobby, AJ meets her roller derby idol Jailer Swift when Swift and her roller derby team are brought in on charges for disorderly conduct. Lola is cleared of all charges and when she goes to meet with the group. The derby team starts fighting among themselves and provides enough distraction for the seven to get away. When out, Tiny and Scalper chases after AJ, while the group steals Tiny and Scalper's car and chases. After escaping the criminal duo they are able to hide out at a rap nightclub. But when they interrupted a performance they are forced to perform on stage, if they are to leave. They improvised a performance based on the situation they are in right now, which pleases the audience. Later Tiny and Scalper show up but they are able to make their escape.

Once safe, Katy remembers that her mother keeps a $100 bill in her coat for emergencies and the group decides to sneak into the local planetarium where the Coopers and Andersons are attending a party to steal it for the truck fees. As Jenny, Katy and Lola sneak into the storage room to look for Mrs. Cooper's coat, the Coopers hear Emily's message and head to the police station to check on their children. The coat turns out to be left at the Cooper's table where the Andersons are sitting, so Lola disguises herself as a wealthy socialite to steal the money. Meanwhile, Bobby takes charge of the catering after one of the chefs quits. Tiny and Scalper are caught by security and the Sapphire Ferret is grabbed.

Once Lola retrieves the money, the group heads to the tow place before it closes and get the car back. Tiny and Scalper are arrested and the Sapphire Ferret is taken to an animal shelter. Lola jokes how Jenny's night is more interesting than going to a concert with Zac and Jenny finally learns why Zac has suddenly become distant. She becomes angry with Lola, but Lola suggests driving to the Psychic Rockets concert to explain everything. Lola trades her precious camera but keeps the memory card in exchange for Jenny's admission so Jenny and Zac can reconcile. The group then races home before the parents. They successfully make it, but upon arrival, they find out about a much bigger mess: the washing machine has burst, with soap everywhere, and the Andersons' dog Lady Marmalade is covered with sauce, which is also all over the floor. Trey wash the car and then helps Emily clean their dog, Jenny and Katy clean the laundry room, and Lola, Bobby and AJ clean the kitchen. Once they all are done, Jenny, Katy and Emily leave to get them back home, and the Andersons' arrive home, where Lola immediately covers up and says they were great. Jenny does the same. As she leaves, Zac arrives telling Jenny he forgot to give Emily her headphones, and the two start dating, much to the delight of Katy and Emily who have been watching. Lola gets her driver's license back from Officer James, who asks her out.

The next day, it is revealed that Lola and Jenny have adopted some of the others' traits, and Jenny declines her photography scholarship, giving it to Lola, who begins a relationship with Officer James. At the end, Lola sends the pictures to Katy, Emily, AJ, Bobby, Trey, Jenny and accidentally Helen.

Cast
 Sabrina Carpenter as Jenny Parker
 Sofia Carson as Lola Perez
 Nikki Hahn as Emily Cooper
 Mallory James Mahoney as Katy Cooper
 Max Gecowets as Trey Anderson
 Jet Jurgensmeyer as Bobby Anderson
 Madison Horcher as AJ Anderson
 Kevin Quinn as Zac Chase
 Gillian Vigman as Helen Anderson
 Gabrielle Miller as Donna Cooper
 Michael Northey as Tiny
 Ken Lawson as Scalper
 Max Lloyd-Jones as Officer James
 Kevin O'Grady as Barry Cooper
 Hugo Ateo as Hal Anderson

Production

Filming
Filming began on March 2, 2015 in Vancouver, British Columbia and wrapped on April 18, 2015. The first teaser was released on October 9, 2015 during the DCOM premiere of Invisible Sister. The first official trailer was released on February 12, 2016 during an episode of Girl Meets World, which also stars Sabrina Carpenter.

Screenplay
Tiffany Paulsen wrote the film's screenplay. It was presumed that the remake was scrapped due to years of inactivity. However, on January 9, 2015, Disney announced that the remake would go forward.

Casting
Raven-Symoné was going to star in the remake but decided to withdraw due to other projects. Miley Cyrus was also rumored to be attached to the project, but later denied involvement. Sabrina Carpenter and Sofia Carson were cast on January 9, 2015. Kevin Quinn, Nikki Hahn, Mallory James Mahoney, Madison Horcher, Jet Jurgensmeyer, Max Gecowets, and Max Lloyd-Jones were cast on August 31, 2015. Also announced the same day were Gillian Vigman, Alissa Skovbye, Arielle Tuliao, Kevin O'Grady, Lisa MacFadden, Ken Lawson, Jasmine Chan, Kathryn Kirkpatrick, Teana-Marie Smith, Michael Roberds, Simon Chin, J.C. Williams, Hugo Ateo, Raf Rogers, Morgan Tanner as Dancer, Curtis Albright, Oliver M. Smith, Kwasi Thomas, Joshua Morettin, Matthew Hoglie, and John Specogna.

Broadcast
Adventures in Babysitting premiered on Disney Channel in the United States and Canada on June 24, 2016, with the series premiere of Bizaardvark as its lead-out. As the network considered Adventures in Babysitting to be the 100th entry in its original movie franchise, Disney Channel announced that it would broadcast each previous movie to lead towards the premiere. The promotion began with a marathon of 53 popular entries in the series over the Memorial Day long weekend, followed by airings of the remainder throughout June.

Ratings
The premiere of the movie attracted 3.45 million viewers.

References

External links
 

2016 television films
2016 films
2016 comedy films
2010s adventure comedy films
2010s American films
2010s English-language films
2010s teen comedy films
Adventure film remakes
Adventure television films
American adventure comedy films
American comedy television films
American teen comedy films
Comedy film remakes
Disney Channel Original Movie films
Disney film remakes
Films directed by John Schultz (director)
Films scored by Richard Gibbs
Films shot in Vancouver
Television remakes of films
Television shows about child care occupations
Teen adventure films